New Dramatists is an organization of playwrights founded in 1949 and located at 424 West 44th Street between Ninth and Tenth Avenues in the Hell's Kitchen (Clinton) neighborhood of Manhattan, New York City.

The members of New Dramatists participate in seven-year residencies to build up their playwriting skills and develop their careers.  In addition to housing resident playwrights, New Dramatists also holds workshops for young authors. The organization hosts an annual luncheon at which actors and producers who have made contributions to American theatre are honored. Brian Stokes Mitchell, Glenn Close, and Meryl Streep are among past honorees.

The New Dramatists have a library that is open to the public on weekdays.

Building
New Dramatists is located in a former church built in the 1880s in the Gothic Revival style. It was the location in turn of St. Matthew's German Lutheran Church, the Lutheran Church of the Redeemer, the Lutheran Metropolitan Inner Mission Society, and, by the mid-1960s, the All People's Church.

Alumni 
New Dramatists' alumni include:
 Glen Berger
 Kia Corthron
 Jorge Ignacio Cortiñas
 Carson Kreitzer
 Peter Maloney (actor)
 Tarell Alvin McCraney
 Suzan-Lori Parks
 Harrison David Rivers
 Charles Smith, playwright
 Charise Castro Smith, television writer and actor
 Octavio Solis
 Mark St. Germain, playwright, author, and film and television writer. 
 Gaye Taylor Upchurch, who has directed plays at the Studio Theatre (Washington, D.C.), the Summer Play Festival, and the Pacific Playwrights Festival

Awards 
Nathan Lane was awarded the New Dramatists' 2019 Distinguished Achievement Award. Audra McDonald, Brian Stokes Mitchell, Daryl Roth, Paula Vogel, and Denzel Washington have received this award in prior years.

History 
New Dramatists was established in 1949 as the New Dramatists Committee. Its formation was instigated by Michaela O'Harra, who became the first executive secretary of the Committee. Howard Lindsay was the first chair; other founders included Benjamin Schankman, Russel Crouse, Richard Rodgers, and Oscar Hammerstein II. The Committee was initially funded by contributions from the Playwrights Company, the Cornell-McClintic Foundation and a donation from John Golden.

References

External links 

 
 New Dramatists Records. Yale Collection of American Literature, Beinecke Rare Book and Manuscript Library.

1949 establishments in New York City
Arts organizations established in 1949
Theatrical organizations in the United States